Lungphunlian is a village in the Champhai district of Mizoram, India. It is located in the Champhai R.D. Block.

Demographics 

According to the 2011 census of India, Lungphunlian has 81 households. The literacy rate of the village is 80.99%.

References 

Villages in Champhai block